RFA Gold Rover was a small fleet tanker of the Royal Fleet Auxiliary and one of five Rover-class ships that were designed by the Admiralty, all of which were built at the Swan Hunter shipyard.

Gold Rover and her sister Black Rover were the last two in service with the RFA on duty around the world. The class were phased out as part of a worldwide effort to replace single-hulled tankers with more environmentally safe double-hulled vessels. Gold Rover herself was decommissioned in a sunset ceremony at Portsmouth Naval Base on 6 March 2017.

Class Characteristics
The Rover class was predominantly used to transport fuel, oil, aviation fuel for services around the globe; it could also carry limited dried stores of 340 tonnes such as munitions and refrigerated goods. They were built with a flight deck large enough to accommodate two helicopters, although no hangar was fitted.

Operational history

1974-1980
In July 1974 Gold Rover participated in evacuation duties during the partition of Cyprus during the Turkish invasion of the island.

1981-1990
Gold Rover was in Singapore at the time of the Falklands Conflict in 1982 and therefore took no part in the hostilities.

On 14 November 1984, Gold Rover sailed from Gibraltar on completion of refit, the last RFA to be refitted in HM Dockyard Gibraltar.

Gold Rover participated in the 1986 Jamaican flood relief operations.

On 1 December 1990, Gold Rover lost her rudder in severe weather in the South Atlantic and sent out a distress call. Some of her crew were airlifted off by a RAF Sea King of No. 78 Sqn and she managed to get to anchor seventeen miles east of Lively island to ride out the storm before she was towed by the tug Oil Mariner to Montevideo for repairs. The crew of the Sea King rescue helicopter, Captained by Flt Lt David Kerr-Sheppard, received various awards for outstanding flying skill in such difficult weather conditions.

1991-2000
In January 2000 she was towed back to Devonport by two RMAS tugs after breaking down off Lizard Point.

2001-2010
2006 was a busy year for Gold Rover. She was in Nigeria in June 2006 for the 50th anniversary celebrations of the formation of the Nigerian Navy. As part of the celebrations there was a Fleet Review by President Olusegun Obasanjo. On 6 October she, along with Royal Navy frigate  and Royal Marines from 40 Commando, seized more than two tonnes of cocaine during a major drugs haul off the coast of West Africa. The illegal drugs, which were found in an unregistered vessel, had a UK street value of some £60 million.

Gold Rover was part of a Royal Navy amphibious task group, the VELA Deployment 06, en route to Sierra Leone where she and other ships were taking part in a major amphibious exercise. Whilst on the way to West Africa Gold Rover was contributing to the global fight against terrorism and the Royal Navy's maritime security operations activity.

2011-2017
Gold Rover entered refit in the middle of 2013. Gold Rover departed her home port for her last operational deployment in 2014.

Between 12 and 16 October 2015 Gold Rover and  participated the bicentennial anniversary commemorations of Napoleon's arrival on Saint Helena after his defeat at the Battle of Waterloo, and subsequent surrender to British forces.

In 2015, she participated in Operation UNITAS.

Gold Rover entered Portsmouth for the final time on 22 February 2017, bowing out after 43 years of active service. On 29 August 2017 the Defence Equipment Sales Authority (DESA) invited expressions of interest from companies interested in receiving an invitation to tender in respect to the proposed sale for the sole purpose of recycling of the former RFA ship.

She was scrapped at Aliaga on 3 September 2019.

References

External links
RFA Gold Rover at royalnavy.mod.uk

Tankers of the Royal Fleet Auxiliary
Rover-class tankers
1973 ships
Ships built by Swan Hunter
Ships built on the River Tyne